The Catedral Santiago Apostól , or in English,  the Cathedral of St. James the Apostle, is a Catholic cathedral located on the town plaza in Fajardo, Puerto Rico. Along with Concatedral Dulce Nombre de Jesus in Humacao it is the seat of the Diocese of Fajardo-Humacao.  It was listed on the National Register of Historic Places as Church Santiago Apóstol of Fajardo in 1984.

History
The parish was established in 1766 and the first church building was completed in 1776.  It was destroyed by an earthquake in 1867.  Construction of the present church began two years later utilizing the side walls and floor tiles of the previous church.  It became a cathedral church when Pope Benedict XVI established the Diocese of Fajardo-Humacao on March 11, 2008.

Architecture
The building was designed by Don Pedro A. Beibal.  It is located on the north side of the town plaza and is surrounded by a balustrade concrete wall with pillars that features metal grillwork gates.  A square bell tower dominates the main façade.  The bells are in the third level contained within open arches.  Two small windows flank the tower and define the side naves on the interior.  The side facades feature a doorway and four windows.  A large parish house, which was built later, blocks the back of the cathedral from view.

Simple pillars divide the main nave from the side aisles in the interior.  The five pillars divide the space into six bays.  The first bay includes the vestibule and features a spiral wooden staircase to the choir loft.  The apse is square in shape and is crowned by a brick lanterned dome.

See also

 Catholic Church by country
 Catholic Church in the United States
 Ecclesiastical Province of San Juan de Puerto Rico
 Global organisation of the Catholic Church
List of Catholic cathedrals in the United States
List of cathedrals in the United States

References

External links
 
 Roman Catholic Diocese of Fajardo-Humacao (Official Site in Spanish)
 GCatholic page for Catedral Santiago Apostol

Santiago Apostol
Fajardo, Puerto Rico
19th-century Roman Catholic church buildings in the United States
Churches on the National Register of Historic Places in Puerto Rico
Religious organizations established in 1766
1867 disestablishments in Puerto Rico
1869 establishments in Puerto Rico
Spanish Colonial architecture in Puerto Rico